The Women's Electoral Lobby (WEL) is a feminist, non-profit, self-funded, non-party political, lobby group founded in 1972 during the height of second-wave feminism in Australia. WEL's mission is to create a society where women's participation and potential are unrestricted, acknowledged and respected and where women and men share equally in society's responsibilities and rewards.

WEL is credited with major achievements for women in Australia in relation to anti-discrimination and equal opportunity legislation, equal pay decisions, the funding of women's and children's services.

WEL  is currently focused on a range of women's issues.

History 

The Women's Electoral Lobby (WEL) was formed in 1972 to conduct a large-scale survey of candidates for the federal election of that year. WEL's intervention in the election campaign was intended to publicise candidates’ views on issues of interest to women and, simultaneously, to mobilise women's political power. It achieved both ends and WEL grew into a major feminist non-party, political lobby group.

WEL was founded at a meeting called by Beatrice Faust in her Melbourne home in February 1972, and WEL groups formed soon after in other capital cities and regional centres. Growing out of the Women's liberation movement, WEL expressed the desire of some activists to affect politics in a direct and practical way. Working in pairs, WEL interviewers pursued and questioned candidates about issues such as equal pay, abortion, child care and sex discrimination. The WEL members were shocked to discover how ignorant many male candidates were about issues that were important to women, and the results of their interviews were enthusiastically reported in the media.

In 1979, the Women's Non-Party Political Association, formerly led by Constance Cooke, which was also lobbying for electoral reform for women, wound up in order to support the work of the Women's Electoral Lobby.

While it is impossible to determine to what extent WEL's electoral activities influenced the outcome (the election of the Australian Labor Party led by Gough Whitlam), it is certain that WEL put "women's issues" on the political agenda. In the longer term, WEL's actions meant that, for decades afterwards, political parties took care to formulate and publicise a written women's policy before each election. That practice ultimately made individual candidate interviews less illuminating, since candidates were able to echo the party's policy rather than risk exposing ignorance or insensitivity. However, the legitimisation of women's policy in the political arena gave considerable leverage to those seeking feminist reform, and created accountability in relation to government commitments made in women's interests.

In the four decades since its founding, WEL has pursued reforms through a distinctive mix of policy analysis and advocacy. It has continued its election work, typically publishing ‘score-cards’ on the parties’ policies and hosting events where candidates are questioned by WEL members and others about their positions. Since it was established WEL has made over 900 submissions to parliamentary and other inquiries. WEL spokeswomen provide media commentary and the organisation has an active website and social media presence.

Achievements 

WEL has played a significant role in important policy and legislative changes such as:

 The passing of equal pay legislation in 1972, which saw women awarded the male rate of pay, no matter what job they performed 
 The decision by the Arbitration Commission in 1974 to equalise the female Minimum Pay rate with the male rate 
 Legitimisation, policy development, legislative reform and community education programs on issues such as equal opportunity, sexual harassment and domestic violence 
 The drafting and implementation of state anti-discrimination and federal sex discrimination legislation 
 Rape law reform, which has gradually led to significant amendments to the NSW Crimes Act

Structure 

The structure of WEL mirrors Australia's federal political system. There are WEL branches in each state and territory, which focus on state policy and a national WEL branch that focuses on federal policy. Because of the overlapping nature of state and federal policy areas and feminist concerns, state and national branches of WEL often work together on projects or to lobby for policy change.

At WEL's 1978 national conference, a decision was made to set up a national office in Canberra, which was originally set up in the laundry of Canberra Women's House in O’Connor.

It was also decided at the conference that WEL would employ a part-time National Communications Officer to ensure communication and information-sharing between WEL branches and to better engage in federal government and politics. This role was at first restricted to supporting national campaigns.

According to the WEL History Project's report on WEL National Convenors, "the position evolved into a more professional lobbyist position... In 1987 Jane Elix, former national co-ordinator, made a powerful plea at a WEL conference for the holder of the position to be authorised to be a media spokeswoman. Elix observed that although founding WEL members believed in non-hierarchical structures and opposed specialisation of roles and functions, in practice this made it difficult to compete in the political arena of the 1980s. While WEL groups clearly did not want to lose power to 'Canberra', often WEL members were in sensitive jobs and were unable to speak publicly on policy." This illustrates an ongoing tension in WEL, which aims to respond quickly to make the most of the media cycle and the political climate whilts still maintaining a de-centralised member-driven structure.

The ANU's WEL History Project documents name changes to the coordinator position and who held that position as follows:

1978 national communications officer

1982 national co-ordinator

1997 executive officer

2000 national convenor

Feminist Policy Framework 
In 2010, the Women's Electoral Lobby dispensed with its usual process of researching and writing individual policies on a range of policy areas in the lead up to the election. Instead, WEL has developed a Feminist Policy Framework, which sets out criteria to test and rate the policies of political parties.

WEL's feminist framework tests how well policies:

 Ensure the benefits and outcomes are fairly distributed between women and men, as well as between different groups of women
 Value and reward fairly people’s different skills, experiences and contributions
 Recognise the value of caring and supporting roles, whether paid or unpaid
 Recognise and rectify past and current inequalities and between men and women; and
 Enhance opportunities for both women and men to take on equal rights and responsibilities in all aspects of society: politics, community, employment and social life

See also

Feminism in Australia
Australian Federation of Women Voters
Edna Ryan (activist)

References

External links 
 WEL Website
 A complete history of WEL is in progress.

Organizations established in 1972
Feminist organisations in Australia
Women's rights in Australia
1972 establishments in Australia
Women's organisations based in Australia